Vasile Săcară (April 6, 1881 – October 7, 1938) was a Romanian politician, journalist, author, and teacher from Soroca, Bessarabia.

In 1917, Vasile Săcară co-founded the magazine Şcoala Moldovenească and formed "Obştea învăţătorilor din Basarabia". He served as a member of the Chamber of Deputies of Romania (1918–1923) and as the first prefect of Soroca County (1923 – September 1924), after which he retired from politics.

Awards
 Ordinul Coroana României în grad de cavaler (1930) 
 Medalia Ferdinand I cu spade şi panglică (1932)

References

External links 
 Săcară, Vasile 
 Leonid Cemortan, Drama intelectualilor basarabeni de stinga

1881 births
1938 deaths
People from Soroca District
Members of the Chamber of Deputies (Romania)
Prefects of Romania
Romanian educators
Romanian journalists
Moldovan journalists
Male journalists
20th-century journalists